Boxing competitions were contested in the Universiade only in 2013 as an optional sport.

Events

Medal table

Medal table

External links
 2013 Summer Universiade – Boxing

 
Sports at the Summer Universiade
Universiade